No Bail for the Judge is 1952 comedy crime novel by the British writer Henry Cecil. It was published in America by Harper Publications. It was the second novel of Cecil, himself a judge, and along with Brothers in Law is one of his best known.

Alfred Hitchcock was interested in making a film out of the novel. It has been described as "one of the most fascinating of Hitchcock's unrealized projects".

Synopsis
A High Court judge finds himself accused of murdering a prostitute. To clear his name his daughter enlists the help of a criminal who 
organises an investigation amongst the streetwalkers of London to find the real culprit.

References

Bibliography
 Allen,Richard & Ishii-Gonzales, Sam . Hitchcock: Past and Future. Routledge, 2004.
 Reilly, John M. Twentieth Century Crime & Mystery Writers. Springer, 2015.
 White, Terry. Justice Denoted: The Legal Thriller in American, British, and Continental Courtroom Literature. Greenwood Publishing Group, 2003.

1952 British novels
Novels by Henry Cecil
Novels set in London
British crime novels